A Decepticon is a faction in Transformers.

Decepticon may also refer to:

Transformers
 Decepticon Hideout, a Transformers book
 Decepticons at the Pole, a Transformers book
 Transformers Decepticons, a video game
 Transformers: Revenge of the Fallen: Decepticons, a video game

Other
 Decepticons (gang), a 1980s street gang based in Brooklyn, New York, United States
 Pheidole decepticon, a species of ant

See also
 Deception (disambiguation)
 Deceptacon (disambiguation)
 Deceptikonz, a New Zealand hip hop group